Rafael Andrade Santos is a Brazilian footballer who last played for Orlando City B of USL League One. Santos had previously played college soccer for Virginia Commonwealth University.

Career 
Santos played three years of college soccer at Virginia Commonwealth University, where during his junior season he won the Atlantic 10 Conference Men's Soccer Player of the Year for the 2017 Atlantic 10 Conference men's soccer season.

He made 55 appearances for the Rams, scoring 20 goals. He was drafted 74th overall by D.C. United in the 2018 MLS SuperDraft, but did not sign with the club. He played in USL League Two (then the PDL) during the 2018 PDL season. He made 13 appearances, scoring four goals for SIMA Aguilas.

In late 2018, Rafael signed with Orlando City B of USL League One. On 4 May 2019, he made his professional debut in a 0–0 draw against Chattanooga Red Wolves. On 31 May 2019, Rafael scored his first professional goal in a 2–2 draw away to FC Tucson.

References

External links 

1995 births
Living people
Association football midfielders
Brazilian footballers
Brazilian expatriate footballers
Brazilian expatriates in the United States
D.C. United draft picks
Expatriate soccer players in the United States
Orlando City B players
Footballers from Rio de Janeiro (city)
SIMA Águilas players
VCU Rams men's soccer players
USL League One players
USL League Two players